Telleri was a book publisher based in Paris, France.

The company specialised in architecture and art books and was active between 1992 and 2007.

References

Year of establishment missing
Book publishing companies of France
Companies based in Paris
Visual arts publishing companies